Ituna is a town in Saskatchewan, Canada. In 2006, it had a population of 622.

The town contains several businesses serving the local residents and rural community, including  financial services, grocery stores, restaurants, and a hotel. The Ituna Theatre, built in 1946, is one of few remaining small town movie theatres still in operation.

Demographics 

Transportation
The community is served by Ituna Airport which is located 2.6 nautical miles (4.8 km) southeast.

History

Ituna has one registered historical site, the Red Brick Schoolhouse that was constructed in 1920 as a composite school for the Fruitville School District.  The school build was closed in 1980 when the town school moved into a new building.

See also 
 List of communities in Saskatchewan
 List of towns in Saskatchewan

References

Ituna Bon Accord No. 246, Saskatchewan
Towns in Saskatchewan
Division No. 10, Saskatchewan